Alexis Guignard, comte de Saint-Priest (27 April 1805 in Saint Petersburg29 September 1851 in Moscow) was a French diplomat, historian, and Peer of France.  He was the eleventh member elected to occupy seat 4 of the Académie française in 1849.

Guignard was the son of an émigré  French nobleman Armand Charles Emmanuel Guignard, comte de Saint-Priest (1782–1863) and his Russian wife, Princess Sophie Galitzine. His grandfather, François-Emmanuel Guignard, comte de Saint-Priest, was one of the last ministers of Louis XVI of France.

Educated in Russia, where his father was the Governor of Podolia and Odessa, Guignard returned to France with his father in 1822. During the July Monarchy, he departed from the Legitimist tradition of his family, particularly that of his uncle Emmanuel Louis Marie de Guignard, vicomte de Saint Priest, to become a warm friend to King Louis-Philippe of France, whom he served between 1833 and 1838 as an ambassador in Brazil, Portugal and Denmark.

In the 1840s, Guignard made his mark as a historian and writer. His most important works were the Histoire de la royauté considérée dans ses origines jusqu'à la formation des principales monarchies de l'Europe (2 vols, 1842), the Histoire de la chute des Jésuites (1844) and the Histoire de la conquête de Naples (4 vols, 1847-1848).

Guignard died while on a visit to Moscow, on 29 September 1851.

Works
 Les ruines françaises - poésies (1823)
 Athenaïs, ou le souvenir d'une femme - comédie (1826)
 Le présent et le passé - épître (1828)
 L'Espagne, fragments de voyage (1830)
 Histoire de la royauté considérée dans ses origines jusqu'à la formation des principales monarchies de l'Europe (2 vol., 1842)
 Histoire de la chute des Jésuites au XVIIIe siècle (1844)
 Histoire de la conquête de Naples par Charles d'Anjou 4 vol. (1847)
 Études diplomatiques et littéraires  (2 vol., 1850)

Bibliography
  This obituary by Albert de Broglie is available through Gallica, Bibliothèque nationale de France

References

1805 births
1851 deaths
Diplomats from Saint Petersburg
Counts of Saint-Priest
Members of the Académie Française
Peers of France
French male non-fiction writers